Below is the complete Electric Light Orchestra (ELO) discography including imports, videos, and hit singles. ELO's back catalogue is unusual since their compilation albums far outweigh their studio output in number, owing to the large number of hit singles primarily written by Jeff Lynne.

From 1972 to 1986, ELO accumulated more combined UK and US Top 40 hits than any other band in the world, and also generated the third most UK and US separate Top 40 hits.

Albums

Studio albums
Below is a table outlining ELO's studio album output.

Notes: The peak chart listings are accurate but incomplete because of the limited availability of past chart information regarding other countries. All of the RIAA and BPI certifications and/or re-certifications listed are out of date, the majority being decades old. The fact that some albums are listed as non-certified does not necessarily mean those albums have not reached certification sales levels. Record companies that own the manufacturing and distribution rights to a particular record have to pay the RIAA, BPI and related bodies to research, audit and certify that record, whether it be an album, single or compilation.

Notes
B ^ Also peaked at number 14 on the US Billboard Top Internet Albums chart.
C ^ Also peaked at number 2 on the US Billboard Top Rock Albums chart. 
D ^ Also peaked at number 6 on the US Billboard Top Rock Albums and Top Album Sales charts.

Live albums

Compilation albums
Charted or certified compilations

Notes
E ^ First charted at #128 week of 1 September 2012 after the London Olympics Opening and Closing Ceremonies featured "Mr. Blue Sky", peaked at #115 week of 26 May 2017.
F ^ Charted at #46 on the US Billboard Top Rock Albums and at #29 on the US Billboard Top Independent Albums charts.

Complete list

Box sets

Extended plays

Singles
Note: Entry boxes containing "—" may pertain to any of the following:
A single not being released in the territory
Various charts listed had ceased to exist before particular singles were released
Accurate but incomplete information
Failure to chart

Notes
G ^ "Confusion" and "Last Train to London" were released as a double A-side in UK and Ireland.
H ^ Actually charted in the Bubbling Under Hot 100 Singles chart.
I ^ Promo DJ single.
J ^ Single available as a digital download and promo 7-inch format.
M ^ Though released in November 1976, it actually became a charting hit for the year 1977.
N ^ Though released in November 1977, it actually became a charting hit for the year 1978.
O ^ Single available as a digital download.

Peak positions on other US Billboard charts

Billboard Year-End performances

American Top 40 year-end performances

Opus year-end performances

Radio & Records

Videos

Music videos

Video albums/concerts

See also
 List of songs recorded by Electric Light Orchestra
 ELO Part II discography
 The Orchestra discography
 The Move discography
 The Idle Race discography
 Traveling Wilburys discography
 Armchair Theatre

References

Discography
Discographies of British artists
Rock music group discographies